Hagop Vartovyan, better known as Güllü Agop, (took later the name Yakub because converted to Islam), (1840 in Istanbul – 1902 in Istanbul) was an Ottoman Armenian theatre director as well as an occasional actor. He is widely credited with having laid the bases for Turkey's modern and nationally renowned performing arts institution that became the Istanbul City Theatres. In his qualities of organizer, sponsor and figure of support for writers and spectators, Güllü Agop is one of the 19th century pioneers of the Turkish Theatre art as a whole. He was accepted as the founder of the modern Turkish Theatre. As an Ottoman Armenian, Güllü Agop was regularly showing Armenian shows in his theatre; after 1868, he decided to provide regular Turkish shows

Biography 
Vartovyan was born in 1840 in Istanbul with the name Agop Vartovyan to Armenian parents. "Güllü Agop" (literally Jacob the Rosy) was the name under which he had come to be known in the world of theatre. He converted to Islam in his forties and took the name "Yakub". He is the father of Necip Yakup Aşkın, considered as one of the most prominent violin masters Turkey produced and his grandson, Yücel Aşkın, was the rector of Van's Yüzüncü Yıl University. He works an academician in the university and is chairman of Environmental Engineering.

Güllü Agop had another son called İhsan Aşkın. After retiring from the army where he served as colonel, he became an actor and took part in around 50 movies.

References 

 

1840 births
Male actors from Istanbul
Armenians from the Ottoman Empire
Ethnic Armenian male actors
Male stage actors from the Ottoman Empire
Theatre directors from the Ottoman Empire
1902 deaths
People from Istanbul
Ethnic Armenian Muslims
Converts to Islam
19th-century male actors from the Ottoman Empire
19th-century Armenian people